Nikita Afanasiev (born 2000) is a Russian chess player. He was awarded the title of Grandmaster by FIDE in 2020.

Chess career
Afanasiev earned the FIDE Master title in 2014, International Master in 2019 and Grandmaster title in 2020.

He qualified to play in the Chess World Cup 2021 through the European continental qualifiers.

In March 2022, he won the Moscow Championship on tie-break ahead of Ivan Eletskiy and Viacheslav Zakhartsov after all scored 7/9.

References

External links

Nikita Afanasiev chess games at 365Chess.com

2000 births
Living people
Chess grandmasters
Russian chess players